Brown Buttress is a wedge-shaped buttress rising to approximately , located near the head of Dickey Glacier, which flows into Beaumont Bay. It was named in honor of R F Brown, a member of the 1960 Cape Hallett winter-over team, working as a technician on the geomagnetic project.

References
 

Rock formations of the Ross Dependency
Shackleton Coast